Arthur Walker may refer to:

Arthur Abney Walker (1820–1894), British surgeon and botanist
Arthur Walker (trade unionist), British trade unionist
Arthur B. C. Walker Jr. (1936–2001), American space physicist
Arthur Earl Walker (1907–1995), American neurosurgeon
Arthur Campbell-Walker (1834–1887), British soldier and golf player
Arthur Geoffrey Walker (1909–2001), English mathematician and physicist
Arthur Henry Walker (1833–1878), English cricketer
Arthur Walker (Irish cricketer) (1891–1968), Irish cricketer
Arthur George Walker (1861–1939), British sculptor and painter
Art Walker (gridiron football) (Arthur D. Walker Jr., 1933–1973), American and Canadian football player
Arthur Walker (spy) (1934–2014), American, convicted with brother of espionage in 1985
Art Walker (triple jumper) (Arthur Franklin Walker, born 1941), American triple jump athlete
Arthur Walker (Pilot) (1953–2016), South African Air Force pilot
Arthur Horace Walker (1881–1947), British Royal Navy officer